L.A.'s Finest is an American action comedy crime television series created by Brandon Margolis and Brandon Sonnier; and produced by Sony Pictures Television. It is a spinoff of the Bad Boys franchise created by George Gallo. The series premiered on Spectrum on May 13, 2019. L.A.'s Finest is the first premium content show made for the cable provider and the debut of its Spectrum Originals banner of exclusive programming. The second season premiered on September 9, 2020. The first season of the series had its American broadcast television premiere on Fox on September 21, 2020. In October 2020, the series was cancelled by Spectrum after two seasons.

Cast and characters

Main
Gabrielle Union as Special Agent/Detective Lieutenant Sydney "Syd" Burnett, an ex-DEA agent who has transferred to the LAPD's Robbery-Homicide Division, and is Nancy McKenna's new partner. She is the sister of Marcus Burnett from the Bad Boys movies.
Jessica Alba as Detective Nancy McKenna, a working stepmother, and secretly a former career criminal when she was Nancy Perez, who is Syd's new partner in the LAPD. Prior to the LAPD, Nancy served in the U.S. Navy as an E.O.D. technician and was awarded both the Navy Cross and Purple Heart (per season 2).
Duane Martin as Ben Baines, a fellow detective and one of "The Bens"
Zach Gilford as Ben Walker a fellow detective and one of "The Bens"
Ryan McPartlin as Patrick McKenna, Nancy's husband, and a Los Angeles assistant district attorney who is subsequently named interim district attorney 
Sophie Reynolds as Isabel "Izzy" McKenna, Nancy's stepdaughter and Patrick's daughter
Ernie Hudson as Joseph Vaughn, Marcus and Syd's estranged father and an ex-LAPD cop

Recurring
John Salley as Fletcher, a computer hacker that Syd knows from her time in Miami
Barry Sloane as Dante Sherman (season 1), the brother of club owner and gangster Ray Sherman who knows Nancy McKenna from her criminal past
Sabina Gadecki as Jen, a sex worker with whom Syd forms an attachment
David Fumero as Lt. Jason Calloway, an LAPD lieutenant with the Narcotics Division and a colleague of Syd's
Jordan Rodrigues as Arlo Bates (season 1), who works for crime boss Gabriel Knox and is tasked with finding the fentanyl that was intercepted by Syd
Joshua Alba as Nico Perez, Nancy McKenna's younger brother
Ciara Wilson as Letti Ramirez, Izzy's friend
Rebecca Budig as Carlene Hart (season 1), a for-hire "fixer" who secretly works for Gabriel Knox and pressures Arlo to find the missing drugs; she is also a suburban mom and possibly LA's biggest drug lord 
Tamala Jones as Katherine Vaughn Miller (season 1), a jewelry store employee whom Arlo targets due to her surprising connection to Syd  
Laz Alonso as Warren Hendrix (season 1), as Syd's former DEA colleague and lover
Curtis Harris as Justice Baines (season 1), Ben Baines' son and Izzy's friend
Jake Busey as Bishop Duvall (season 1), a crime lord
Adam Rose as Nathan Baker
Miguel Gomez as Ricky Leon
Taylor Black as Emma Mitchell 
Kurt Yaeger as Clete Winslow
Beau Knapp as Malcolm Ward
D. J. Cotrona as Luca Verone
Timothy V. Murphy as Logan Kline
Kelly Rowland as Faith Baines, Ben Baines' wife

Notable guest stars
Zach McGowan as Ray Sherman, Dante's brother who owns a nightclub and is involved in criminal activities (in "Pilot" and "Con Air")
Rebecca Field as Alice Kensler, the drunk driver who killed Izzy's mother (in "Armageddon" and "Bad Girls")
Eddie Cahill as Michael Alber, director of DEA Special Operations (in "Armageddon" and "Bad Girls")
Sharon Lawrence as Gloria Walker (in "Beverly Hills Cops" and "Bad Company")
Orlando Jones as Lt. Marshawn Davis (in "Coyote Ugly", "Drum line","Deliver Us from Evil", and "For Life")
Kelly Hu as Angela Turner
Hayley Erin as Desiree Roberts (in Beverly Hills Cops)

Episodes

Season 1 (2019)

Season 2 (2020)

Production

Development
On October 25, 2017, it was reported that a television series spinoff of the Bad Boys films featuring the character Sydney "Syd" Burnett from Bad Boys II was in development. The pilot was set to be written by Brandon Margolis and Brandon Sonnier. Executive producers were expected to include Margolis, Sonnier, Jerry Bruckheimer, Jonathan Littman, KristieAnne Reed, Jeff Gaspin, and Jeff Morrone. Production companies involved with the series were set to include Sony Pictures Television, Jerry Bruckheimer Television, and 2.0 Entertainment.

On October 31, 2017, it was announced that NBC had given the production a pilot production commitment following a competitive situation where multiple networks had pursued the potential series. On January 18, 2018, it was announced that NBC had given the production an official pilot order. On February 2, 2018, it was reported that Anton Cropper would direct the pilot episode. On April 12, 2018, it was announced that the previously untitled pilot had been titled L.A.'s Finest. On May 11, 2018, it was reported that NBC had passed on the pilot and declined to pick up the production to series. The producers of the series were expected to shop the production to other networks.

On May 17, 2018, it was announced that Sony Pictures Television was in preliminary discussions with Charter Communications regarding a deal to pick up the series. By the end of the month, the talks had progressed to the point of serious negotiations. On June 26, 2018, it was announced that Charter Communications had given the production a series order for a first season consisting of thirteen episodes. On February 7, 2019, it was announced during the Television Critics Association's annual winter press tour that the series would premiere on May 13, 2019 with the release of the first three episodes. The remaining episodes were expected to be released on Mondays following the premiere via Spectrum's video on demand service accessible through their set-top cable boxes, along with the provider's iOS, Apple TV, and Roku applications. L.A.'s Finest is the first original television series produced by Spectrum.

The theme music for the series was composed by Laura Karpman.

On June 13, 2019, the series was renewed for a second season which was originally set to premiere on June 8, 2020, but on that date it was announced it had been pushed to "as-yet-[un]specified" date later in the year, in response to ongoing protests over police brutality. In August 2020, it was announced that the series would now premiere all thirteen episodes on September 9, 2020. On October 14, 2020, Spectrum canceled the series after two seasons.

Casting
Alongside the initial series development announcement, it was confirmed that Gabrielle Union would star in the series, reprising her role of Sydney "Syd" Burnett from the film Bad Boys II. On January 29, 2018, it was announced that Ernie Hudson had been cast in a series regular role. On February 15, 2018, it was reported that Zach Gilford and Duane Martin had joined the main cast. In March 2018, it was announced that Jessica Alba, Ryan McPartlin, and Zach McGowan had been cast as series regulars. In September 2018, it was reported that Sophie Reynolds had been cast in a series regular role and that Barry Sloane would appear in a recurring capacity. In October 2018, David Fumero and Jordan Rodrigues joined the series in recurring roles. On January 11, 2019, it was announced that Jake Busey had joined the cast in a recurring role.

Filming
Principal photography for the pilot began in early April 2018 in Los Angeles, California.

On February 21, 2019, executive producer and showrunner Brandon Sonnier was seriously injured during the shooting of a car stunt at the Port of Los Angeles when the vehicle accidentally crashed into the video village area of the set, which led to a partial amputation on his right leg. Brandon Margolis sustained minor injuries.

Release

United States
On February 7, 2019, the official trailer for the series was released. The series premiered on Spectrum on May 13, 2019. L.A.'s Finest is the first premium content show made for the cable provider and the debut of its Spectrum Originals banner of exclusive programming. In June 2019, Spectrum Originals renewed the series for a second season, which premiered on September 9, 2020.

In May 2020, Fox acquired the broadcast rights for the series' first season to fill in primetime broadcast hours due to production suspensions during the COVID-19 pandemic and premiered on September 21, 2020.

In January 2021, the first season was added to Netflix. The second season was added on Amazon in July 2021.

International
The series was syndicated for airing in the United Kingdom by Fox. In Canada, the series aired on CTV in Fall 2019. Outside North America, the series has aired in France on TF1, in Southeast Asia on AXN Asia, in the UK on 5USA, in Germany on  AXN Germany and in India on Zee Café. The show premiered in Australia on 10 Bold on November 7, 2019 before joining catch-up streaming service 10 Play. The second season premiered in early 2021 on 10 Bold in Australia. All 26 episodes are available on 10 Play.

Reception

Critical response
On review aggregator Rotten Tomatoes, the series holds an approval rating of 24% based on 17 reviews, with an average rating of 4.56/10. The website's critical consensus reads, "A spin-off to nowhere, L.A.'s Finest operates on outdated sensibilities and wastes its talented leads' time—especially unfortunate considering Gabrielle Union's committed performance." On Metacritic, it has a weighted average score of 50 out of 100, based on 8 critics, indicating "mixed or average reviews". The series ranked 9th in TVLine's The 10 Worst Shows of 2019.

Accolades

References

External links

2010s American crime drama television series
2010s American LGBT-related drama television series
2010s American police procedural television series
2020s American crime drama television series
2020s American LGBT-related drama television series
2020s American police procedural television series
2010s American police comedy television series
2020s American police comedy television series
American crime comedy television series
American action comedy television series
2019 American television series debuts
2020 American television series endings
American action television series
Bad Boys (franchise)
Bisexuality-related television series
Detective television series
English-language television shows
Fictional portrayals of the Los Angeles Police Department
Live action television shows based on films
Spectrum Originals original programming
Fox Broadcasting Company original programming
Television series by Sony Pictures Television
Television shows filmed in Los Angeles
Television shows set in Los Angeles